The Hangzhou Olympic Sports Expo Center or Hangzhou Olympic Sports Center is a multipurpose sports complex in Hangzhou, Zhejiang Province, China.

It was completed in 2018 and it is used mostly for soccer matches. The main stadium was designed with a capacity of 80,000 spectators.

The stadium is built by NBBJ in partnership with CCDI.

Gallery

References

External links
Stadium information
Stadium information

Buildings and structures under construction in China
Sports venues in Zhejiang
Buildings and structures in Hangzhou
NBBJ buildings
Venues of the 2022 Asian Games